Vigeville is a commune in the Creuse department in the Nouvelle-Aquitaine region in central France.

Geography

Population

Sights
The church, dating from the fifteenth century.

Church "without a steeple" boasts an altarpiece and two wooden polychrome statues of the seventeenth century. Walking along the cemetery you can see over the wall a replica of the Eiffel Tower Granite. Presence of a lodging of stage and a cottage in France for all information contact the Town Hall. In the village the hills of the presence of a Tilleu Suly.

See also
Communes of the Creuse department

References

Communes of Creuse